A regional transmission organization (RTO) in the United States is an electric power transmission system operator (TSO) that coordinates, controls, and monitors a multi-state electric grid. The transfer of electricity between states is considered interstate commerce, and electric grids spanning multiple states are therefore regulated by the Federal Energy Regulatory Commission (FERC). The voluntary creation of RTOs was initiated by FERC Order No. 2000, issued on December 20, 1999. The purpose of the RTO is to promote economic efficiency, reliability, and non-discriminatory practices while reducing government oversight.

An independent system operator (ISO) is similarly an organization formed at the recommendation of FERC.  In the areas where an ISO is established, it coordinates, controls, and monitors the operation of the electrical power system, usually within a single US state, but sometimes encompassing multiple states.  RTOs typically perform the same functions as ISOs but cover a larger geographic area.

The two are similar, with an RTO being more clearly defined and born out of the concept of electrical grid reliability. The delineation between an ISO and an RTO is subtle to some and quite specific to others, as the similarities in the table below illustrate:

In short, an ISO operates a region's electricity grid, administers the region's wholesale electricity markets, and provides reliability planning for the region's bulk electricity system. Today's RTOs do the same thing with an added component of greater responsibility for the transmission network, as established by the FERC.

Background

FERC Orders 888 & 889
In April 1996, the Federal Energy Regulatory Commission (FERC) issued two orders that changed the landscape of how electricity is generated, transmitted, and distributed throughout the North America. Prior to these rulings, generated power and the subsequent energy provided to customers by local service providers was owned and controlled by single entities who often owned the entire generation, transmission, and distribution assets. Because these companies controlled the retail delivery of the energy from generation through their own power lines, consumers had little to no choice regarding whose electricity they were buying.

In economic terms, this structure constituted an impediment for new providers who would want to generate power, move energy, or provide retail electricity to individual consumers.

Order No. 888 addressed "Promoting Wholesale Competition Through Open Access Non-discriminatory Transmission Services by Public Utilities; Recovery of Stranded Costs by Public Utilities and Transmitting Utilities." and Order No. 889 added and amended existing rules "...establishing and governing an Open Access Same-time Information System (OASIS) (formerly real-time information networks) and prescribing standards of conduct."

Order No. 888
Order No. 888 is often cited as the "Deregulation" of the electric industry; deregulation, however, is not an accurate term. In actuality, the electricity industry is still regulated (depending on the region) by a series of federal, state, and local agencies and various public commissions.  Order No. 888 is substantial in scope.  Relative to this article, however, it defined two key elements:
 An acknowledgment that barriers to competitive wholesale markets may exist and that those barriers must be removed
 Permit utilities to recover stranded costs associated with providing open access to transmission

In addressing #1 above, Order No. 888 defined the fundamental purpose of an ISO to “…operate the transmission systems of public utilities in a manner that is independent of any business interest in sales or purchases of electric power by those utilities.” The order, however, did not mandate or require the establishment of ISOs. Rather, in an attempt to comply with the FERC's order, groups of participants (or “Power Pools” composed of generators, transmission providers and utilities) partnered, and proposed to the FERC, for the right to establish designs of independent system operations. Through negotiation, collaboration and legal challenges, the first ISOs to emerge included California ISO, PJM Interconnection, New York ISO and New England ISO. Each proposed a slightly different market design according to their collaborative results. In order to facilitate competitive wholesale markets, Order No. 888 specified the unbundling of a utility's operations separating generation and transmission and distribution.

In addressing #2 above, the original order (and subsequent clarification by the FERC) allows utilities, under certain defined circumstances, to seek extra-contractual recovery of stranded costs. The FERC continues to receive rehearing petitions regarding stranded cost recovery as it has clearly placed the importance on remedying what it terms as “undue discrimination” at the forefront.

It is important to note that Order No. 888 was not met without objection among the public, academics and industry participants. Requests for rehearing and/or clarification were filed by 137 entities after the order's issuance. The majority agreed with the FERC's assertion for the need to harness the benefits of competitive electricity markets.

Order No. 889
Order No. 889, amended rules establishing and governing the Open Access Same-time Information System (OASIS) (formerly real-time information networks) and prescribed standards of conduct for its use and access. Subsequent orders provided clarifications, standards and protocols.

FERC Order 2000
Where as Order No. 888 provided for an entity (an ISO) to facilitate open access, it was not written with the intent to establish one. FERC Order No. 2000 was:

Issued by the FERC on December 29, 1999, Order No. 2000 codified what it means to be an RTO including its minimum characteristics, functions and ratemaking policy. The order also stated its commitment toward open architecture with a stated goal that an RTO "...be designed so that they can evolve over time." The order still, however, does not mandate that a new entity called an RTO be created, nor does it mandate that an entity call itself an RTO to comply with the FERC's order.

Independent system operators (ISOs)
An ISO is an organization formed at the direction or recommendation of the Federal Energy Regulatory Commission (FERC).  In the areas where an ISO is established, it coordinates, controls and monitors the operation of the electrical power system, usually within a single US State, but sometimes encompassing multiple states.

Similar to an RTO, the primary difference is that ISOs either do not meet the minimum requirements specified by FERC to hold the designation of RTO or that the ISO has not petitioned FERC for the status.

Electric utilities that are located within the United States and engage in interstate commerce fall under FERC authority. Not all utilities are members of ISOs. All utilities and ISOs, however, are responsible to meet the compliance of a larger organization called the North American Electric Reliability Corporation (NERC) which overlays the entire FERC footprint and also includes a Mexican utility and several Canadian utilities.  As such, international reciprocity is commonplace, and rules or recommendations introduced by FERC often are voluntarily accepted by NERC members outside of FERC's jurisdiction.  Therefore, one Canadian Province is a member of a US-based RTO, while two others function as an Electric System Operator (ESO), an organization essentially equal to a US-based ISO.

Within the United States one ISO, and its participating utilities, does not fall under FERC authority: The Electric Reliability Council of Texas (ERCOT). ERCOT does fall under the authority of NERC and operates a reliability function, separate from its market function, in order to comply with NERC requirements.

ISOs act as a marketplace operator in wholesale power, resulting from FERC order No. 888.  Most are set up as nonprofit corporations using governance models approved by FERC and/or regional or local commissions.

There are regions of the United States where ISOs do not exist and, consequently, the utilities do not engage in wholesale power markets. The Pacific Northwest, and states east of California and west of the Dakotas, Nebraska, Kansas and Texas largely do not participate. The majority of Southeastern states also do not participate in wholesale markets. While these regions must conform to open access as mandated by FERC, the power exchanges between utilities is mostly facilitated through bilateral contracts and power purchase agreements.

Current ISOs
There are nine ISOs within North America:
 CAISO - California ISO
 NYISO - New York ISO
 Electric Reliability Council of Texas (ERCOT); also a Regional Reliability Council
 Midcontinent Independent System Operator - Midcontinent ISO
 ISO-NE - ISO New England
 SPP - Southwest Power Pool
 PJM - Pennsylvania-New Jersey-Maryland Interconnection
 AESO - Alberta Electric System Operator
  Independent Electricity System Operator (IESO); operates the Hydro One transmission grid for Ontario, Canada

The New Brunswick System Operator (NBSO) was dissolved when New Brunswick's new Electricity Act went into effect on October 1, 2013.

Regional transmission organizations (RTOs)
An RTO is an organization formed at the approval of the Federal Energy Regulatory Commission (FERC). In the areas where an RTO is established, it coordinates, controls and monitors the operation of the electrical power system, usually within a single US State, but sometimes encompassing multiple states. The official definition for an RTO: "An entity that is independent from all generation and power marketing interests and has exclusive responsibility for grid operations, short-term reliability, and transmission service within a region."
The designation of an RTO is largely one of scope. In addition, an organization wanting to achieve RTO status must petition the FERC for approval and meet 4 minimum characteristics and 8 minimum functions:

Characteristics

Independence – an RTO should be independent from its market participants in financial interests, decision-making, and tariff-setting. 
Scope and regional configuration – the region for an RTO should be chosen to achieve the necessary regulatory, reliability, operational, and competitive benefits.
Operational authority – an RTO must have the authority to control its transmission facilities (e.g. switching elements in and out of service, monitoring and controlling voltage) and must be the security coordinator for its region. 
Short-term reliability – an RTO must ensure the region meets the NERC reliability standards or alert FERC if it does not.

Functions

Tariff administration and design – in order to ensure non-discriminatory transmission service, an RTO must be the sole provider of transmission service and sole administrator of its own open access tariff.
Congestion management – an RTO must ensure the development and operation of market mechanisms to manage transmission congestion.
Parallel path flow – an RTO must develop and implement procedures to address parallel path flow issues within its region and with other regions.
Ancillary services – an RTO must serve as the supplier of last resort for all ancillary services and determine if the minimum amount of ancillary services have been supplied according to FERC Order No. 888.
OASIS and Total Transmission Capability (TTC) and Available Transmission Capability (ATC) – an RTO must be the single OASIS site administrator for all transmission facilities under its control and independently calculate TTC and ATC.
Market monitoring – an RTO must monitor market behavior and report market power abuses and market design flaws to FERC.
Planning and expansion – an RTO must have ultimate responsibility for both transmission planning and expansion within its region that will enable it to provide efficient, reliable and non-discriminatory service.
Interregional coordination – an RTO must  coordinate its activities with other regions.

Only electric utilities that are located within the United States fall under FERC authority, but a larger organization called the North American Electric Reliability Corporation (NERC) overlays the entire FERC footprint and also includes a Mexican utility and several Canadian utilities.  As such, international reciprocity is commonplace, and rules or recommendations introduced by FERC often are voluntarily accepted by NERC members outside of FERC's jurisdiction.  Therefore, one Canadian Province is a member of a U.S.-based RTO, while two others function as an Electric System Operator (ESO), an organization essentially equal to a U.S.-based ISO.

Some ISOs and RTOs also act as a marketplace in wholesale power, especially since the electricity market restructuring of the late 1990s.  Most are set up as nonprofit corporations using governance models developed by FERC.

FERC Orders 888 and 889 defined how independent power producers (IPPs) and power marketers would be allowed fair access to transmission systems, and mandated the implementation of the  Open Access Same-Time Information System (OASIS) to facilitate the fair handling of transactions between electric power transmission suppliers and their customers.

TSOs in Europe cross state and provincial borders like RTOs.

History of RTOs
RTOs were created by the Federal Energy Regulatory Commission (FERC) as a way to handle the challenges associated with the operation of multiple interconnected independent power supply companies. FERC describes this as a voluntary system. The traditional model of the vertically integrated electric utility with a transmission system designed to serve its own customers worked extremely well for decades. As dependence on a reliable supply of electricity grew and electricity was transported over increasingly greater distances, power pools were formed and interconnections developed. Transactions were relatively few and generally planned well in advance.

However, in the last decade of the 20th century, some policy makers and academics projected that the electrical power industry would ultimately experience deregulation, and RTOs were conceived as the way to handle the vastly increased number of transactions that take place in a competitive environment. About a dozen states decided to deregulate but some pulled back following the California electricity crisis of 2000 and 2001.

RTOs ensure three key free marketer drivers: 1) open access and non-discriminatory services, 2) the continued reliability of a system unequaled anywhere else, and 3) multiple transmission charges that will not negate the savings to the end-use customer. Critics of RTOs counter that the wholesale electricity market as operated through the RTOs is in fact raising prices beyond what would obtain in a truly competitive situation, and that the organizations themselves add a needless layer of bureaucracy.  While the original intention was for the RTOs to remain an independent, non-profit organization and were given nearly autonomous control of their service area.  The primary committees, and a majority of participant committees are almost entirely represented by investor owned utilities and have eroded States power and Federal authority. 

The RTO concept provides for separation of generation and transmission and elimination of pancaked rates, and it encourages a diverse membership including public power. Wider membership contributes to the establishment of an entity with the size necessary to function as an RTO.

Purpose
In the 1990s, as states and regions in the United States established wholesale competition for electricity, groups of utilities and their federal and state regulators began forming independent transmission operators that would ensure equal access to the power grid for non-utility firms, enhance the reliability of the transmission system and operate wholesale electricity markets. Today, seven of these grid operators, either independent system operators (ISOs) or RTOs, coordinate the power grid to ensure the reliable delivery of two-thirds of the electricity used in the United States to two-thirds of its population. Most are overseen by FERC.

ISOs and RTOs coordinate generation and transmission across wide geographic regions, matching generation to the load instantaneously to keep supply and demand for electricity in balance. The grid operators forecast load and schedule generation to assure that sufficient generation and back-up power is available in case demand rises or a power plant or power line is lost. They also operate wholesale electricity markets that enable participants to buy and sell electricity on a day-ahead or a real-time spot market basis. These markets provide electricity suppliers with more options for meeting consumer needs for power at the lowest possible cost.

ISO/RTOs provide non-discriminatory transmission access, facilitating competition among wholesale suppliers to improve transmission service and provide fair electricity prices. Across large regions, they schedule the use of transmission lines; manage the interconnection of new generation and monitor the markets to ensure fairness and neutrality for all participants. Providing these services regionally is more efficient than providing them on a smaller-scale, utility by utility.

Today's power industry is far more than a collection of power plants and transmission lines. Maintaining an effective grid requires management of three different but related sets of flows – the flow of energy across the grid; the exchange of information about power flows and the equipment it moves across; and the flow of money between producers, marketers, transmission owners, buyers and others. ISO/RTOs play an essential role in managing and enhancing all three of these flows.

Current RTOs
As of 2020 there are nine ISO/RTOs operating in North America:
 Alberta Electric System Operator (AESO) - ISO
 California Independent System Operator (CAISO) - ISO 
 Electric Reliability Council of Texas (ERCOT) - ISO
 Midcontinent Independent System Operator, Inc. (MISO) - RTO
 ISO New England (ISO-NE) - RTO
 New York Independent System Operator (NYISO) - ISO
 Ontario Independent Electricity System Operator (IESO) - ISO 
 PJM Interconnection (PJM) - RTO
 Southwest Power Pool (SPP) - RTO

Non-RTO transmission organizations:
 Columbia Grid
 Northern Tier Transmission Group

ColumbiaGrid
ColumbiaGrid, a nonprofit corporation, is not a regional transmission organization (RTO) and has no plans to become one, but instead seeks to achieve many of the benefits of an RTO through incremental additions to its functions. ColumbiaGrid was formed after some of its members chose not to continue in efforts to form Grid West, a Northwest evolutionary structure with the ability to add functions and to move toward independent grid management. The ColumbiaGrid members, including the Bonneville Power Administration, several Washington State public utilities and two investor-owned utilities, wanted an organization with more limited functions and no independent ability to change. ColumbiaGrid performs single-utility transmission planning and expansion via an open and transparent process and is also establishing a multi-system OASIS portal.

The former Grid West participants who had argued for an eventual RTO, mainly investor-owned utilities and state representatives from Oregon, Idaho, Montana, Wyoming and Utah, formed the Northern Tier Transmission Group (NTTG), a nascent effort open to evolution but initially focused on inexpensive and relatively easy improvements to grid management, including area control error (ACE) diversity interchange, currently underway; transparent methodologies for calculating available transmission capacity; and planning, as required by FERC Order 890.

See also

 Energy policy of the United States
 Transmission system operator (TSO)
 European Network of Transmission System Operators for Electricity
 Energy law
 Electricity distribution

References

Electric power transmission system operators in North America